The PhatBox is a digital music player that can interface with many different automobile head units.  It can play unprotected WMA, MP3, Ogg Vorbis, FLAC, and AAC (with optional AAC plugin).  The PhatBox emulates a CD Changer so it is fully controlled through the existing disc and track buttons on the listener's head unit.  Feedback is provided in the form of text to speech announcements through a system called SSA (Simple Stereo Architecture).  This allows one to browse by playlist, album, artist, or genre and skip through discs by first-letter.  Each P/A/A/G appears as a disc and each songs within the selected category appears as a track.

Kenwood has also branded the Kenwood-compatible PhatBox as the Kenwood Music Keg.

Digital audio players